Wang You (7 June 1910 – 6 May 1997), also known as Yu Wang, was a Chinese biochemist. He was a pioneer of antibiotics and biochemistry studies in China.

Life
Wang was born in Hangzhou, Zhejiang Province. He first studied applied chemistry at Zhejiang University. He went to Nanjing and graduated from the Department of Industrial Chemistry, University of Nanking in 1931. He obtained his PhD from the Ludwig Maximilian University of Munich in 1937.

Between November 1952 and July 1984, chronologically, Wang was the deputy director, acting director, director (later the honorary director 1984–1997) of the Shanghai Institute of Organic Chemistry, Chinese Academy of Science (Shanghai Institute of Organic Chemistry is the most prestigious institute for organic chemistry research in China).

Wang participated and played an important role in the artificial synthesis of cattle insulin. He also made contributions to modern Chinese biochemical industries.

Membership
 Member, Chinese Academy of Science (1955 election)
 Foreign member, French Academy of Sciences (1984) 
 Foreign member, Bavarian Academy of Sciences and Humanities (1988) 
 Honorary member, American Society for Biochemistry and Molecular Biology (1986)

References

External links
 Wang's profile, the Shanghai Institute of Organic Chemistry, Chinese Academy of Science

1910 births
1997 deaths
Biologists from Zhejiang
Chemists from Zhejiang
Chinese biochemists
Ludwig Maximilian University of Munich alumni
Members of the Chinese Academy of Sciences
Scientists from Hangzhou
Zhejiang University alumni